The Örebro Mission was a Protestant denomination in Sweden. It was founded in Örebro in 1892 by Baptist pastor John Ongman and was part of the Baptist Union of Sweden until 1936. In 1997, the denomination became part of the Evangelical Free Church in Sweden.

References

External links

1892 establishments in Sweden
1997 disestablishments in Sweden
Protestantism in Sweden
Christian organizations disestablished in 1997
Christian organizations established in 1892
History of Örebro
Culture in Örebro
Christian denominations in Sweden